Jourdaine Ronaldo Fletcher (born 23 September 1997) is a Jamaican international footballer who plays as a forward for I-League club NEROCA.

Club career

Early career
Fletcher played for Cornwall College in Montego Bay, Jamaica, where he won the DaCosta Cup in 2016. He then played at club level with Faulkland FC and Montego Bay United.

In 2017, he played college soccer in the United States for San Jacinto College in Houston, Texas, before transferring in 2018 to Eastern Florida State College.

In September 2018, Fletcher re-signed with Montego Bay United after returning to Jamaica following trials in Malta. In January 2019, Fletcher transferred to Mount Pleasant.

Gokulam Kerala
On 20 February 2022, he signed with Indian I-League defending champions Gokulam Kerala, as the team is going to represent the country in 2022 AFC Cup. He scored a brace for the club on 7 March in their 5–1 win against Real Kashmir. After back to back wins in both the group and championship stages, the club clinched I-League title in 2021–22 season, defeating Mohammedan Sporting 2–1 in the final game at the Salt Lake Stadium on 14 May, and became the first club in fifteen years to defend the title.

At the 2022 AFC Cup group-stage opener, Fletcher played a key role as his side achieved a historic 4–2 win against Indian Super League side ATK Mohun Bagan. He scored a goal against Bangladeshi side Bashundhara Kings in their 2–1 defeat in last match before being knocked out.

NEROCA
In September 2022, Fletcher continued his stay in India and signed with I-League club NEROCA.

International career
Fletcher made his international senior team debut in 2017 against the United States in a 1–0 defeat. He then scored his first goal for his country against Bermuda on 11 March 2020 in their 2–0 friendly win.

Career statistics

Honours
Gokulam Kerala
I-League: 2021–22

References

External links

1997 births
Living people
Jamaican footballers
Jamaica international footballers
Montego Bay United F.C. players
Association football forwards
Jamaican expatriate footballers
Jamaican expatriate sportspeople in the United States
Expatriate soccer players in the United States
Mount Pleasant Football Academy players
Cornwall College, Jamaica alumni
Gokulam Kerala FC players
Jamaican expatriate sportspeople in India
Expatriate footballers in India
NEROCA FC players